The Love Piker is a 1923 American silent romantic drama film directed by E. Mason Hopper and starring Anita Stewart, Robert Frazer and Betty Francisco.

Synopsis
A wealthy society woman falls in love with an engineer, but as their wedding approaches she is self-conscious about his old-fashioned poverty-stricken father and fails to invite him to the ceremony.

Cast
 Anita Stewart as Hope Warner
 William Norris as 	Peter Van Huisen
 Robert Frazer as 	Martin Van Huisen
 Carl Gerard as Archie Pembroke 
 Arthur Hoyt as Professor Click
 Betty Francisco as 	Edith Cloney
 Winston Miller as Willie Warner
 Mayme Kelso as Mrs. Warner
 Frederick Truesdell as 	Mr. Warner
 Robert Bolder as 	Butler
 Cordelia Callahan as 	Maid
 James F. Fulton as 	Judge

References

Bibliography
 Connelly, Robert B. The Silents: Silent Feature Films, 1910-36, Volume 40, Issue 2. December Press, 1998.
 Munden, Kenneth White. The American Film Institute Catalog of Motion Pictures Produced in the United States, Part 1. University of California Press, 1997.

External links
 

1923 films
1923 drama films
1920s English-language films
American silent feature films
Silent American drama films
Films directed by E. Mason Hopper
American black-and-white films
Goldwyn Pictures films
1920s American films